Ajami or Ajamiyya, which comes from the Arabic root for 'foreign' or 'stranger', is an Arabic-derived script used for writing African languages, particularly those of Mandé, Hausa and Swahili, although many other African languages are written using the script, including , Mooré, Pulaar, Wolof, and Yoruba. It is an adaptation of the Arabic script, so as to write sounds not found in standard Arabic. Rather than adding new letters, modifications usually consist of additional dots or lines added to pre-existing letters.

History 
The script was first used between the 10th and 16th centuries. It was likely originally created with the intent of promoting Islam in West Africa. The first languages written in the script were likely old Taseelhit or medieval Amazigh, Kanuri, or Songhay. Later, Fulfulde, Hausa, Wolof, and Yoruba would use the script. By the 17th century the script was being used to publish religious texts and poetry. Guinean Fulani poetry was written in Ajami from the middle of the 18th century.

During the pre-colonial period Qur'anic schools taught Muslim children Arabic and, by extension, Ajami. 

Following Western colonization, a Latin orthography for Hausa was adopted and the Ajami script declined in popularity. Some anti-colonial groups and movements continued to use Ajami. An Islamic revival in the 19th century led to a wave of Ajami written works.

Ajami remains in widespread use among Islamic circles, but exists in digraphia among the broader populace. Ajami is used ceremonially and for specific purposes, such as for local herbal preparations in the Jula language.

Hausa Ajami script

There is no standard system of using Ajami, and different writers may use letters with different values. Short vowels are written regularly with the help of vowel marks (which are seldom used in Arabic texts other than the Quran). Many medieval Hausa manuscripts, similar to the Timbuktu Manuscripts written in the Ajami script, have been discovered recently and some of them describe constellations and calendars.

In the following table, some vowels are shown with the Arabic letter for t as an example.

See also
Wolofal script
Aljamiado
Jawi script
Perso-Arabic script
Timbuktu Manuscripts
Arwi

References

Further reading
 Bonate, Liazzat JK. "The use of the Arabic script in northern Mozambique." Tydskrif vir letterkunde 45, no. 1 (2008): 133–142.
 Dobronravine, Nikolai, and John E. Philips. "Hausa ajami literature and script: Colonial innovations and post-colonial myths in northern Nigeria." Sudanic Africa 15 (2004): 85–110.
 
 Lüpke, Friederike. "Language planning in West Africa-who writes the script?." Language documentation and description 2 (2004): 90–107.
 Mumin, Meikal. "The Arabic Script in Africa: Understudied Literacy." In The Arabic Script in Africa, pp. 41–76. Brill, 2014.
 Naim, Mohammed C. "Arabic Orthography and Some Non-Semitic Languages." Islam and its Cultural Divergence. Ed. Girdhari L. Tikku. University of Illinois Press: Chicago (1971).
 Ngom, Fallou. "Ajami scripts in the Senegalese speech community." Journal of Arabic and Islamic Studies 10 (2010): 1–23.
 Robinson, David. "Fulfulde literature in Arabic script." History in Africa 9 (1982): 251–261.

External links
 
PanAfrican L10n page on Arabic script and "Ajami"
Omniglot page on Hausa Ajami Script

Arabic alphabets
Writing systems of Africa